Tangu may refer to:
Tanggu District, China
Tangu, Iran, a village in Kerman Province, Iran